Charles L. Smith (October 24, 1892 – November 7, 1982) was the Mayor of Seattle, Washington from March 6, 1934 to 1936.

Personal life
Smith was born in Osceola, Washington, on October 24, 1892, to Louis and Mary Smith. He married Gladys Loer June 2, 1922, who was a buyer for Frederick and Nelson Stores, and also a Certified Pilot.

Background
He attended the University of Washington, in Seattle. He was a three-time "All Time Letter Winner", for the Huskies football team as a quarterback, in 1913, 1914, and 1923.

Charles L. Smith was first elected as City Attorney for the City of Auburn, Washington, on December 5, 1916.

He was elected into the office of Mayor of Seattle on March 6, 1934.

Waterfront Strike of 1934

During his term of office as Mayor, he had to contend with a violent Waterfront Labor dispute. The Strike began on May 9, 1934 as the Longshoremen in all ports of the West Coast walked out. Sailors from other ports walked out days later in support of the Longshoremen. In mid-June Employers offered a tentative agreement.

As the proposal was debated, Mayor Smith declared a "State of Emergency" on June 14 and forced the police to mobilize to open the ports, which led to a standoff with the protestors. June 16 all Union Locals, except Los Angeles rejected the tentative offer. After the tentative agreement was rejected by the Longshoremen, the tensions and violence started escalating.
Mayor Smith vowed to intervene on June 20 and The Seattle Post Intelligencer headlined "POLICE WILL OPEN PORTS TODAY!". The city and county amassed 300 police, 200 special deputies and 60 State Troopers. Strikers were outraged by Mayor Smith's betrayal of a promise to remain neutral and reinstated the embargo on Alaska Cargo. On July 3 in San Francisco the violence escalated, sparking a riot.

Two days later "Bloody Thursday" occurred when police started shooting tear gas at the strikers. Seven strikers died on the Coast that summer, including a Seattle longshoreman shot by guards in Everett. A Seattle "special deputy" also died during a clash with strikers near the Smith Tower.

Seattle Police armed themselves with Tommy Guns and gas grenades to defend Piers 90 and 91, while strikers lay down on train tracks to idle the docks. Mayor Charles Smith prodded Chief of Police George Howard to be more forceful, and Howard finally resigned rather than trigger a blood bath. The mayor took over and began arresting scores of suspected "Communists," but not enough to secure his re-election that fall.

The 1934 waterfront strike ended with a union victory and spurred passage of federal laws ensuring workers' right to organize and bargain collectively. Further reforms and the production demands of World War II helped to pacify labor-management relations in most industries.

Due in part to his participation in the Labor Dispute, Mayor Smith Lost the election to Dore, by a large margin. Smith 62,185, Dore 46,469. Smith was defeated for re-election in the 1936 primary election.

Later years
Smith continued to practice law until 1960, when he and his wife Gladys traveled extensively.

The couple were both injured in a serious boat explosion while aboard the El Philern II in Bull Harbor, British Columbia, on July 22, 1960. The explosion set off a fire which then destroyed the boat. Mr and Mrs Smith were taken to a hospital in Alert Bay, British Columbia, for minor injuries. Mr. Smith suffered, bruises cuts, and burns when he was struck by a flying hatch cover, which was thrown from the explosion.

They decided to settle into a warmer climate in the winters and chose Mesa, Arizona. In the Spring and Summer they would drive back from Arizona and spend their time with family at Pine Lake, Issaquah, Washington.

Smith died in Carson City, Nevada with Gladys by his side on November 7, 1982. He was 90.

References

External links
Charles L. Smith at HistoryLink.org

1892 births
1982 deaths
Washington (state) Republicans